"I Paralyze" is a song written by John Farrar and Steve Kipner. It was produced for American singer-actress Cher on 1982, as the second single from her seventeenth album of the same name by Columbia Records.

No music video was ever made for the song, which did not help the song's chart fortunes.

Promotion
Cher once performed "I Paralyze" in American Bandstand on ABC in front of a cheering crowd. The song is among Cher's personal favorites. In Behind The Music, a TV special from 2000, Cher said: "I loved it then, and I still love it now, and I want to re-record it."

External links
Official Cher site

Cher songs
1982 singles
Songs written by John Farrar
Songs written by Steve Kipner
Song recordings produced by John Farrar
Articles containing video clips
1982 songs